East Avenue may refer to a street in many cities:

 East Avenue (Quezon City), Philippines
 East Avenue (Rochester, New York), and related East Avenue Historic District
 East Avenue station, Rochester,

See also
East Street (disambiguation)
E Street (disambiguation)